Mundford is a village and civil parish in the English county of Norfolk.

The villages name means 'Munda's ford'.

The civil parish, in 1845, had 437 inhabitants, and 1609 acres of land, exclusive of a common of 190 acres, and also 90 acres of heath, where the parishioners had the right of fuel and rabbits, but no pasturage. The population at the 2011 Census had reduced to 1,526 in 652 households. The parish shares boundaries with the adjacent parishes of Didlington, Cranwich, Weeting-with-Broomhill, Lynford and Ickburgh. The parish falls within the district of Breckland. Local government responsibilities are shared between the parish, district and county councils.

Local history
Lynford Quarry in Mundford is a well-preserved in-situ Middle Palaeolithic open-air site dating to 60,000 years ago that is believed to show evidence of Neanderthal activity.

Church
St. Leonard's is the ancient parish church here. The earliest parts of the church were built in 1220; the font is 14th century with a 17th-century cover. In the early 20th century, Captain F.J.O. Montagu of Lynford Hall commissioned Sir Ninian Comper to complete the front pews of the nave, the pulpit, reading desk, organ loft and case, reredos, chancel stalls and ceiling. There is a good ring of six bells, all of which were cast by John Taylor & Co in 1945. The organ is a 3 manual instrument built by Harrison & Harrison of Durham in 1912. The tradition of this Church is moderate Catholic and vestments are worn. In the 16th century the Killingworth family were the patrons (see below). In 1845 Sir Richard Sutton was patron, and the vicar was the Rev. John Raven, B.A.

Manors
There were two recorded manors at Mundford (anciently Montfort after that family) both originally held of the Church. One was West Hall. On the 26 July 1561, Richard Killingworth (d.1586), as Lord of West Hall manor in the parish of Mundford, presented to the church there, of which he was Patron. His son & heir-apparent, John Killingworth (d.1617), presented in 1574, and Richard the father again on 16 August 1577. Giles Killingworth [John's son and heir-apparent] presented on 21 July 1608. Giles died seized of the manor etc., on 26 February 1634, leaving by his second wife Elizabeth, daughter of Samuel Hare in the City of London, a son and heir, James, then aged 15. Soon after this the manor was purchased by his cousin, Sir Giles Alington of Horseheath, Knt., (d.1638) and settled on James, his son by his second wife Dorothy, daughter of Michael Dalton. James died young after a fall from a horse, and the manor passed to his half-brother, William, 1st Lord Alington (1610-1648). By 1845 Lord Berners possessed West Hall. The other was East Hall Manor, also purchased about 1630 by Sir Giles Alington but by 1845 most of the parish belonged to Sir Richard Sutton, Lord of East Hall.

World War II
On 16 December 1942, British double agent Eddie Chapman was flown on a mission to Britain by the Germans in a Focke-Wulf bomber, converted for parachuting, from Le Bourget airfield. He was equipped with wireless, pistol, cyanide capsule and £1,000 and, amongst other things, was given the task of sabotaging the de Havilland aircraft factory at Hatfield. After an uncomfortable flight, during which he suffered a nosebleed due to a poorly tightened oxygen mask, Chapman became stuck in the hatch as he tried to leave the aircraft. Finally detaching himself, he landed some distance from the target location of Mundford, near the village of Littleport, Cambridgeshire.

References

http://kepn.nottingham.ac.uk/map/place/Norfolk/Mundford

External links

 Genealogical information relating to Mundford from GenUKI

Villages in Norfolk
Breckland District
Civil parishes in Norfolk